In Greek mythology, Asbolus (Ancient Greek: Ἄσβολον or Ἄσβόλη means "sooty" or "carbon dust") was a centaur. He was a seer and Hesiod calls him an augur (oionistes οἰωνιστής) who read omens in the flight of birds.

Mythology 
Asbolus foresaw the Centaurs' battle against the Lapiths at Pirithous' wedding, and unsuccessfully attempted to prevent them from attending.

The above is mentioned in Ovid's Metamorphoses,

He appears again when Heracles came to visit the centaur Pholus. Pholus opened a jug of wine for him which belonged to all the Centaurs; Asbolus saw Pholus do this and brought the other Centaurs, who, as it was proved by Pirithous' wedding, were unused to the drink. It resulted in a bloodbath in which Pholus and Chiron, as well as Nessus, met their deaths at Heracles' hands. It is said that Asbolus himself was crucified by Heracles' arrows.

Namesake 
Asbolus' name was given to 8405 Asbolus, a minor planet in the outer Solar System. It belongs to the class of centaurs, whose orbits lie between Jupiter and Neptune.

Notes

References 

 Hesiod, Shield of Heracles from The Homeric Hymns and Homerica with an English Translation by Hugh G. Evelyn-White, Cambridge, MA.,Harvard University Press; London, William Heinemann Ltd. 1914. Online version at the Perseus Digital Library. Greek text available from the same website.
 Publius Ovidius Naso, Metamorphoses translated by Brookes More (1859-1942). Boston, Cornhill Publishing Co. 1922. Online version at the Perseus Digital Library.

 Publius Ovidius Naso, Metamorphoses. Hugo Magnus. Gotha (Germany). Friedr. Andr. Perthes. 1892. Latin text available at the Perseus Digital Library.
 Tzetzes, John, Book of Histories, Book V-VI translated by Konstantinos Ramiotis from the original Greek of T. Kiessling's edition of 1826. Online version at theio.com.

Centaurs
Characters in Greek mythology